Terence Jerome Dials, Jr. (born July 15, 1983) is an American former professional basketball player. He played collegiately with the Ohio State Buckeyes. He has been playing professionally since 2006 for various teams outside of his country of the United States.

Dials was born in Detroit, Michigan but grew up in Boardman, Ohio and attended Boardman High School there. A power forward, he once broke a basketball backboard during a team practice in high school. He was offered an athletic scholarship to play for Ohio State University. During his four-year career with the Buckeyes, Dials scored 1,566 points and grabbed 876 rebounds in 132 total games played. He was named the Big Ten Conference Men's Basketball Player of the Year as a senior in 2005–06. Dials went undrafted in the 2006 NBA Draft.

For the 2012–13 season he signed with Hyères-Toulon of the LNB Pro B. In April 2013, he signed with his former team Orléans Loiret Basket. In November 2014, he signed with BBC Monthey of Switzerland.

References

External links
French League profile
Terence Dials at DraftExpress
Terence Dials at Eurobasket
Draft Prospect Profile at NBA.com

1983 births
Living people
American expatriate basketball people in China
American expatriate basketball people in Cyprus
American expatriate basketball people in France
American expatriate basketball people in Germany
American expatriate basketball people in Switzerland
American expatriate basketball people in Taiwan
American expatriate basketball people in Uruguay
American men's basketball players
Apollon Limassol BC players
Basketball Löwen Braunschweig players
Basketball players from Detroit
Basketball players from Ohio
BBC Monthey players
Club Malvín basketball players
Élan Béarnais players
HTV Basket players
Ohio State Buckeyes men's basketball players
Orléans Loiret Basket players
Paderborn Baskets players
People from Boardman, Ohio
Power forwards (basketball)
Pauian Archiland basketball players
Super Basketball League imports